Rejmyre is a locality situated in Finspång Municipality, Östergötland County, Sweden with 900 inhabitants in 2010. Rejmyre is best known for Reijmyre Glasbruk, a glass manufacturer founded in 1810.

References 

Populated places in Östergötland County
Populated places in Finspång Municipality